Three Men of the River is a 1943 Argentine crime drama film directed by Mario Soffici and starring Elisa Galvé and José Olarra. The film is based on an old Argentine legend about an Aztec girl who is raped and murdered by vandals and dumped in a river. A flower blossoms at the place in which she was killed and misfortune falls upon the culprits.

Three Men of the River was one of the most critically acclaimed films of 1943 in Argentina, winning five Silver Condor awards at the 1944 Argentine Film Critics Association Awards, with cinematographers Leo Fleider and Francis Boeniger winning the Silver Condor Awards for Best Camera Operator and Best Cinematography respectively, and Leticia Scuri winning the Silver Condor Award for Best Supporting Actress. The film also won Best Original Screenplay and Best Music. At the Argentine Academy of Cinematography Arts and Sciences awards it also won Best Director for Soffici, Best Original Screenplay, Best Supporting Actress for Scuri, and Best Cinematography and Best Camera Operator for Boeniger and Fleider.

Cast
Elisa Galvé
José Olarra
Agustín Irusta
Luis Aldás
Leticia Scuri
Juan José Míguez
Homero Cárpena
Lucy Blanco
Roberto Ferradás
Luis Tortorelli

References

External links
 

1943 films
1940s Spanish-language films
Argentine black-and-white films
Films directed by Mario Soffici
1943 crime drama films
Argentine crime drama films
1940s Argentine films